Gustav Adolf Church is a church in Habo Municipality in Sweden. Belonging to the Gustav Adolf Parish of the Church of Sweden, it was moved from Fiskebäck in 1780.

References

External links

Churches in Habo Municipality
Churches in the Diocese of Skara